Robert Edward Blackburn (born April 12, 1950) is a senior United States district judge of the United States District Court for the District of Colorado.

Personal life and education 
Blackburn was born in Lakewood, Colorado. He received a Bachelor of Arts degree from Western State College of Colorado in 1972. He received a Juris Doctor from the University of Colorado Law School in 1974. He was in private practice in Las Animas, Colorado, from 1975 to 1980. He was a deputy district attorney of Sixteenth Judicial District Attorney's Office, Colorado from 1980 to 1986. He was a county attorney of Bent County, Colorado, from 1980 to 1988. He was a Municipal judge, Town of Kim, Colorado, from 1985 to 1988. He was a judge on the Sixteenth Judicial District of Colorado from 1988 to 2002.

Federal judicial service 
Blackburn was nominated to be a United States District Judge for the United States District Court for the District of Colorado by President George W. Bush on September 10, 2001, to a seat vacated by Zita Leeson Weinshienk. He was confirmed by the United States Senate on February 26, 2002, and received his commission on March 6, 2002. He assumed senior status on April 12, 2016.

Jurisprudence in practice

Individual rights

Blackburn has argued that the Fifth Amendment protection from individuals being compelled to testifying against themselves does not apply to testimony which is required to decrypt a protected data source in order to provide prosecutors with evidence. He suggests that the convenience of prosecutors in acquiring evidence in this manner overrules the otherwise inalienable right to avoid being "compelled in any criminal case to be a witness against himself".

Critics have argued that since the password to an encrypted data source is a part of the defendant's mind, compelled testimony to reveal it is a direct violation of the Fifth Amendment.

References

External links

Robert E. Blackburn *District of Colorado

1950 births
Living people
Colorado state court judges
Judges of the United States District Court for the District of Colorado
People from Lakewood, Colorado
United States district court judges appointed by George W. Bush
21st-century American judges
University of Colorado Law School alumni
Western Colorado University alumni